III is the third studio album by American indie folk band the Lumineers. The album was released on September 13, 2019.

Composition
In addition to being the Lumineers' third album, the album title also references the fact that the album is presented in three chapters, each focusing on a different main character of the fictional Sparks family. Lumineers co-founder Jeremiah Fraites told Rolling Stone, "This collection of songs worked out in a beautiful way, and I feel with this album we've really hit our stride." In an interview with NPR, Fraites and Schultz both discussed how their lives have been impacted by drug addiction, saying that this album was intended to chronicle the effects of addiction on family members and loved ones. "Schultz says he had a childhood friend in New Jersey who slowly came apart as a teenager because of drug addiction. Both band members experienced this because Schultz's friend, Josh Fraites, was the brother of his future bandmate, Jeremiah." 

As of September 19, 2019, the Lumineers have released 10 music videos from the first 10 tracks of the album, chronicling the main characters and their journey living alongside addiction.

Commercial performance
III debuted at number two on the US Billboard 200 with 86,000 album-equivalent units, including 73,000 pure album sales. It is the Lumineers' third top-two album in the US.

Track listing

Personnel
Credits adapted from Tidal.

The Lumineers
 Wesley Schultz − vocals, guitar, engineering
 Jeremiah Fraites − drums, piano, guitar, background vocals, synthesizer, vibraphone, cymbals, scraper, tambourine, engineering

Additional musicians
 Byron Isaacs − bass, background vocals
 Lauren Jacobson − violin, background vocals
 Simone Felice − maracas, background vocals
 David Baron − synthesizer, keyboards, harmonium
 Anneke Schaul-Yoder − cello, yodeling

Technical

 Simone Felice – producer
 Bob Ludwig – mastering
 David Baron – mixing, engineering
 Ryan Hewitt – mixing, engineering
 Alen Adzi Stefanov – engineering
 Darren Heelis – engineering
 Pete Hanlon – engineering
 Connor Milton – assistant engineer
 Will Duperier – assistant engineer
 Dylan Nowik – assistant

Design
 Nicholas Sutton Bell – creative director
 Kevin Phillips – photography
 Max Knies – photography
 Tomas Cristobal Patlan – portrait photography

Charts

Weekly charts

Year-end charts

References

3
The Lumineers albums
3
Dualtone Records albums
3